Punchi Banda Unantenne (born 13 September 1913) was a Ceylonese politician. He was the member of Parliament of Sri Lanka from Hanguranketha representing the Sri Lanka Freedom Party from 1970 to 1977. He was defeated in the general elections in March 1960, July 1960, 1965 and 1977 .

References

Members of the 7th Parliament of Ceylon
Sri Lanka Freedom Party politicians
1913 births
Date of death missing
Year of death missing